Nashtifan (also Romanized as Nashtīfan; also known as Nashtīqan, Nīshāfūn, and Nīshtāfūn) is a city in the Central District, Khaf County, Razavi Khorasan Province, Iran. At the 2006 census, its population was 6,547, in 1,485 families.

References 

Populated places in Khaf County
Cities in Razavi Khorasan Province